Distractive Killusions is the third full-length album by Polish symphonic black metal band Vesania. It was recorded at Studio X in Olsztyn, Poland by Szymon Czech and Vesania. The record was mixed and mastered at Studio X by Szymon Czech and Orion with virtual assisitance of Siegmar. The album was released worldwide in November 2007. A limited edition digipak version was also released, containing two bonus tracks. This is the first album with Valeo as a real band member. The album was originally released under Napalm Records but was released under Mystic Production in Poland.

Orion commented after the release of Distractive Killusions:

Track listing 
All music by Vesania, except "Neurodeliri" by Bulldozer. Arranged by Orion, Daray and Siegmar.

Digipak bonus tracks

Personnel 
 Tomasz "Orion" Wróblewski – guitars, vocals
 Dariusz "Daray" Brzozowski – drums and percussion
 Krzysztof "Siegmar" Oloś – keyboard, additional guitars
 Filip "Heinrich" Hałucha – bass guitar
 Marcin "Valeo" Walenczykowski – guitars
 Piotr Gibner – vocals on Infinity Horizon
 Szymon Czech – engineering, mix, mastering
 Krzysztof "Sado" Sadowski – photography, cover concept
 Tanzteufel – cover design and artwork

References

External links 
 Official website
 Encyclopaedia Metallum
 'DISTRACIVE KILLUSIONS' OUT NOW!

2007 albums
Vesania albums
Napalm Records albums
Mystic Production albums